So This Is London is a 1930 American pre-Code comedy film directed by John G. Blystone and starring Will Rogers, Irene Rich, Frank Albertson and Lumsden Hare.

It was based on the 1922 play So This Is London by Arthur Goodrich, which was adapted again in 1939. An American and an Englishman clash over which country is the greater, while their children have a secret love affair. The plot was relatively similar to They Had to See Paris (1929), a previous film starring Rogers.

Cast

 Will Rogers as Hiram Draper
 Irene Rich as Mrs Hiram Draper
 Frank Albertson as Junior Draper
 Maureen O'Sullivan as Elinor Worthing
 Lumsden Hare as Lord Percy Worthing
 Mary Forbes as Lady Worthing
 Bramwell Fletcher as  Alfred Honeycutt
 Dorothy Christy as Lady Amy Ducksworth

References

External links

1930 films
1930 comedy films
Fox Film films
American comedy films
1930s English-language films
Films directed by John G. Blystone
Films set in London
Films set in England
Films with screenplays by Sonya Levien
American black-and-white films
1930s American films